Mielcarz is a Polish surname. Notable people with the surname include:

 Maciej Mielcarz (born 1980), Polish footballer
 Magdalena Mielcarz (born 1978), Polish actress

Polish-language surnames